Diego Llopis Caules (2 May 1929 – 11 November 2013) was a Spanish professional footballer who played as a defender.

Career
Born in Ciutadella de Menorca, Llopis played for Mallorca.

Later life and death
Llopis died in his native town on 11 November 2013 at the age of 84.

References

1929 births
2013 deaths
People from Ciutadella de Menorca
Sportspeople from Menorca
Spanish footballers
RCD Mallorca players
La Liga players
Association football defenders